Brian Kennedy Conacher (born August 31, 1941) is a Canadian former professional ice hockey player, coach, executive and broadcaster. Conacher played 155 games in the National Hockey League (NHL) with the Toronto Maple Leafs and Detroit Red Wings between 1961 and 1972, winning the Stanley Cup with Toronto in 1967. He later played one season in the World Hockey Association (WHA) with the Ottawa Nationals in 1972–73. In the mid-1960s Conacher reinstated as an amateur player and joined the Canadian national team, playing at the 1964 Winter Olympics. He later served as a coach in the minor North American Hockey League, and general manager of both the Indianapolis Racers and Edmonton Oilers in the WHA. He was the manager of Maple Leaf Gardens until 1998. Conacher also held the position of Chief Executive Officer of the Royal Agricultural Winter Fair.

Personal information
Conacher is the son of Lionel Conacher, who was voted Canada's top athlete for the first half of the century. He was educated at Toronto's Upper Canada College.

His brother, Lionel Jr., was a professional Canadian football player.

Charlie Conacher and Roy Conacher are Brian's uncles.

He is the cousin of Murray Henderson and Pete Conacher.

Playing career
Conacher played on the Canadian Olympic hockey team coached by Father David Bauer at the 1964 Winter Olympics at Innsbruck, Austria. He was also a player for the Toronto Maple Leafs, playing full seasons during the 1967 and 1968 campaigns. He won the Stanley Cup with the Maple Leafs in 1967. In 1968, he played in the NHL All-Star Game, though not as an All-Star but as a member of the Toronto Maple Leafs (in those years, the current Stanley Cup Champion played the All-Star team). Brian was notable in that game as one of only two players to wear a helmet. After 1968, he was relegated, once again, to the minor leagues, until he finally finished his NHL career with a final season with the Detroit Red Wings in 1971–72. He then decided to try out the new World Hockey Association, joining the Ottawa Nationals for a season.

Coaching career
After retiring as a player, Conacher had a few small coaching stints in the minor leagues before becoming the general manager of the WHA Indianapolis Racers, and then the same position in 1977–78 with the WHA Edmonton Oilers.

Conacher was also a part-time coach with Upper Canada College. Some of the students he coached became collegiate and/or professional hockey players: Syl Apps III, Jason Cipolla (played with the St. John's Maple Leafs), Andre Faust (Philadelphia Flyers), Mike McKee (Quebec Nordiques), and NHL first round pick Daniel Tkaczuk.

Broadcasting career
As a broadcaster, Conacher was most notable as fellow UCC graduate Foster Hewitt's colour man during the 1972 Summit Series. He also teamed with Curt Gowdy to call hockey for the U.S. coverage of the 1976 Winter Olympics on ABC.

Career statistics

Regular season and playoffs

International

References

External links
 

1941 births
Living people
Canadian ice hockey centres
Canadian people of Scottish descent
Canadian television sportscasters
Detroit Red Wings players
Edmonton Oilers executives
Fort Worth Wings players
Ice hockey players at the 1964 Winter Olympics
Mohawk Valley Comets (NAHL) players
National Hockey League broadcasters
North American Hockey League (1973–1977) coaches
Olympic Games broadcasters
Olympic ice hockey players of Canada
Ottawa Nationals players
Rochester Americans players
Ice hockey people from Toronto
Stanley Cup champions
Toronto Maple Leafs players
Toronto Marlboros players
Upper Canada College alumni
Western Mustangs men's ice hockey players